"Megamix" is a song by the Dutch band Vengaboys released in 1999 from their remix album The Remix Album.

Track listing
"Megamix" (Single Edit)
"Megamix" (Short Maxi Edit)
"Megamix" (Long Maxi Edit)

Charts

Year-end charts

References

2000 singles
Vengaboys songs
Eurodance songs
2000 songs
Songs written by Wessel van Diepen
Songs written by Dennis van den Driesschen